Lourdes González (born 30 May 1962) is a Cuban diver. She competed in the women's 3 metre springboard event at the 1980 Summer Olympics.

References

1962 births
Living people
Cuban female divers
Olympic divers of Cuba
Divers at the 1980 Summer Olympics
Place of birth missing (living people)